Ubiquitin specific peptidase 5 is an enzyme that in humans is encoded by the USP5 gene.

Interactions 

USP5 has been shown to interact with TADA3L.

References

Further reading